Johannes Hermann August Wilhelm Max Spohr (November 17, 1850 in Braunschweig – November 15, 1905 in Leipzig) was a German bookseller and publisher. He was one of the first publishers worldwide who published LGBT publications. Later Adolf Brand in Berlin published the first LGBT periodical magazine Der Eigene.

Spohr was born in 1850 as the son of businessman Karl Wilhelm Friedrich Spohr and Ferdinande Lisette. He worked in Pécs, Hannover and Leipzig. With Rudolf Wengler he founded the publishing company Wengler & Spohr in Braunschweig.  On December 20, 1880, he married Elisabeth Hannöver-Jansen, and fathered three sons with her. In 1897, Magnus Hirschfeld founded the Scientific Humanitarian Committee with Spohr, the lawyer Eduard Oberg, and the writer Franz Joseph von Bülow.

In 2001, 96 years after his death, a street in Leipzig was named by his family name.

In honor of Max Spohr, the German LGBT organisation Völklinger Kreis established the Max-Spohr-Management-Preis for companies in Germany that have a good record of diversity management.

References 

 Mark Lehmstedt: Bücher für das „dritte Geschlecht“. Der Max Spohr Verlag in Leipzig. Verlagsgeschichte und Bibliographie (1881-1941). Harrassowitz. Wiesbaden 2002.  .in  Reihe Schriften und Zeugnisse zur Buchgeschichte. Veröffentlichungen des Leipziger Arbeitskreises zur Geschichte des Buchwesens; Bd. 14
 Albert Knoll (ed.): Die Enterbten des Liebesglücks: Max Spohr (1850 - 1905). pioneer of gay literature. Forum Homosexualität und Geschichte München e.V.. 2001.

External links 
 Literature by and over Max Spohr in catalog of Deutschen Nationalbibliothek.
 Forum-Muenchen: Die Enterbten des Liebesglücks

1850 births
1905 deaths
German publishers (people)
19th-century German businesspeople
German LGBT rights activists